is a Japanese OVA anime series produced by Sunrise. It is the direct sequel to the 1997 anime television series The King of Braves GaoGaiGar and the first Brave metaseries officially funded by Bandai, following the acquisition of Sunrise. The series is directed by Yoshitomo Yonetani and written by both Fuyunori Gobu and Yuichiro Takeda. It was released in Japan from January 21, 2000 to March 21, 2003 with a total of 8 episodes. A 12-episode TV re-imagining, with the subtitle Grand Glorious Gathering was broadcast on TV Tokyo from April 11, 2005 to June 27, 2005. A crossover sequel light novel, which focuses on the unused concept of the series, was released on Sunrise's Yatate Bunko imprint on September 30, 2016.

Plot
The year is 2007, two years after the Gutsy Galaxy Guard thwarted the invasion of the Zonders and Mamoru's departure to the Tri-Solar System with Galeon. The organization is tracking down mysterious black machines called Q-Parts which possesses high regenerative properties. The criminal group known as BioNet stole one of the machines that were being researched at CERN. Gai, who is now working with Renais-Kardif Shishioh and the biologist Papillon Noir to take back one of the Q-Parts from BioNet using GGG's newest trump card: the GaoFighGar. However, beyond the GGG's concern over the Q-Parts, a familiar figure reappears and along with it, an upcoming calamity that would destroy the universe. Thus, the King of Braves is again dragged into a new conflict...

Production

Premise
The series is comprised eight episodes and is chronologically set after the events at the end of the original television series, featuring new and returning characters from the television series and other GaoGaiGar media. Notable inclusions are the return of Mamoru and Galeon; the first anime appearance of Renais Kerdif-Shishioh, Gai's cousin from GGG's sister organization Chasseur (as first seen in the novel "Queen of Leo <Leon Reine>: The King of Braves Gaogaigar 2005". as well as GaoGaiGar's successor mechanoids GaoFighGar and Genesic GaoGaiGar.

Themes
Final has a very different set of themes from the original series, focusing primarily on two central themes. The first is "together with the oath sworn through courage", a phrase which Gai and many of the other heroes reference many times throughout Final.  The oath is not an actual oath per se, but rather an embodiment of the will of the heroes to fight to their last breath.  It is the concept that, as Papillon Noir says in the finale, they will always overcome the difficulties ahead of us as long as they have courage.

The second primary theme is Christian Mythology and the recurring imagery of God versus the Devil, a concept briefly touched on during the last fight of the original series.  It forms the core philosophy of the Planetary Master Palpalapa, who believes that when two great powers clash, the victor becomes God and the vanquished becomes the Devil.  He quite clearly sees himself as God, and at two points he mentally sees Gai as the Devil, the demon who brings ruin.  The theme is also evident in Palpalapa's ultimate attack, "God and Devil"; a powerful technique that mirrors Gai's "Hell and Heaven" attack. Later in Final, Gai (or rather, Genesic GaoGaiGar) is revealed to be the God of Destruction, the one who brings the hope of a fresh start from zero, the challenge of infinite possibility.  The dualist nature of GaoGaiGar suggests that there must then be a God (or Goddess) of Protection - all factors indicate that this would be Mikoto Utsugi, herself an invincible life-form formed from the remains of the power of Zonder Metal.

Grand Glorious Gathering
Starting in April 2005, a twelve episode "re-imagining" of the series, GaoGaiGar Final: Grand Glorious Gathering, aired on TV Tokyo. Due to the different running lengths of the OVA versus the space allowed on TV, the episodes were re-edited and spread across those twelve episodes. Footage from the original TV series and new voice recordings were used to fill in the allotted time, as well as new footage which almost exclusively serves to further establish a connection between GaoGaiGar and the anime series "Betterman", which takes place in the same world and setting. Several incidences of nudity found in the OVA were also censored or omitted.

Media

Anime
The original OVA series ran from January 21, 2000 to March 21, 2003. The opening song from Episodes 1-6 is titled  by Masaaki Endoh while Episode 7 is titled  by Masaaki Endoh with the GGG Sound Choir. The first ending song is titled , performed by Saeko Suzuki for Episodes 1-6 and by MIQ in episode 7 while the second ending song is titled  by the anime's official cast. Muse Communication licensed the series for distribution outside Japan and will begin streaming on Muse Asia YouTube Channel in Southeast Asian territories on March 22, 2022. Discotek Media announced the OVAs will be released on Blu-ray in 2023.

The anime remaster was then broadcast in TV Tokyo from April 11, 2005 to June 27, 2005 before being replaced by Gun Sword on its timeslot. The opening theme is titled  by Masaaki Endoh while the ending songs reuse the songs from the OVA except for certain episodes.

Light novel
A sequel web light novel, titled  was written by Yuichiro Takeda and released by Sunrise under the Yatate Bunko imprint from September 30, 2016 to March 17, 2021. It serves as a crossover to Betterman, using unused concepts from GaoGaiGar Final Project Z. The story takes place 8 years after the events of the OVA, focusing on both Mamoru and Kaido and the newly formed Gutsy Global Guard as they battle against the threat of Triple Zero, known also as The Power. While another faction known as Somniums, stars to mysteriously support GGG as they prepare for an event referred as the Age of Patria. Two novels volume is released by Shinkigensha on June 22, 2017 and April 28, 2020.

An ongoing web manga adaption was released in September 2018, written by Yuichiro Takeda and illustrated by Naoyuki Fujisawa. The first tankobon volume was released on March 27, 2019.

Video games
The series has been included in various video games, starting with Bandai Namco Entertainment's long running Super Robot Wars franchise, starting from 3rd Super Robot Wars Alpha: To the End of the Galaxy. King of Kings: GaoGaiGar vs. Betterman made its debut in Super Robot Wars 30

References

External links
 Official GaoGaiGar Final website (Japanese)
 Official GaoGaiGar vs. Betterman website (Japanese)
 Official GaoGaiGar vs. Betterman The Comic website (Japanese)
 

2000 anime OVAs
2005 anime television series debuts
Action anime and manga
Bandai Namco franchises
MF Bunko J
Muse Communication
Sunrise (company)
TV Tokyo original programming
Brave series
Super robot anime and manga
Light novels
Light novels first published online
Super Robot Wars